The Bonn Agreement is a European environmental agreement.

Following several oil spills in 1969, the coastal nations of the North Sea formed the Bonn Agreement to ensure mutual cooperation in the avoidance and combating of environmental pollution.

The agreement was revised in 1983 to include the European Union and again in 2001 to allow Ireland to join.

Members of the Bonn Agreement are Belgium, Denmark, the European Community, France, Germany, Ireland, the Netherlands, Norway, Sweden, United Kingdom and Spain.

External links 
www.bonnagreement.org - The Bonn Agreement web site (English version)

Environmental treaties
Bonn
Treaties concluded in 1969
1969 in the environment
Treaties of Belgium
Treaties of Denmark
Treaties entered into by the European Union
Treaties of France
Treaties of West Germany
Treaties of Ireland
Treaties of the Netherlands
Treaties of Norway
Treaties of Sweden
Treaties of the United Kingdom
1969 in West Germany
European Union and the environment

de:Bonner Konvention